Brahms is a crater on Mercury. It has a diameter of 100 kilometers. Its name was adopted by the International Astronomical Union (IAU) in 1979. Brahms is named for the German composer Johannes Brahms, who lived from 1833 to 1897.

References

Johannes Brahms
Impact craters on Mercury